Jean Marie Sylla (born April 22, 1983 in Conakry) is a retired Guinean professional footballer who played as a left midfielder.

Career
Sylla began his football career at Horoya Conakry, with whom he won Guinea National Championship in 2001. He then spent most of his professional career in Greece. He played for Heraklion-based Beta Ethniki side Ergotelis, most notably helping them achieve promotion to the Greek Superleague for the first time in their history, scoring the winning injury time goal vs. Akratitos during the 2003−04 Alpha Ethniki relegation play-off match. He left the club after the 2004–05 season following contractual disputes after the club was relegated back to the Beta Ethniki, and eventually joined Superleague side Kallithea. After one season in top-flight at the El Paso, Sylla stayed in Greece until 2011, playing for OFI, Apollon Kalamaria, PAS Giannina and Kalamata at various levels of the Greek football league system.

In 2011, Sylla moved to France and continued his career with CFA clubs Villemomble Sports and ES Viry-Châtillon. Having left the club in 2014 to tend to a family-related issue, Sylla was diagnosed with Charcot's disease in September 2014, and was forced to retire at age 31.

Career statistics

Honours

Club
Horoya
 Guinée Championnat National: 2001

References

External links
 
Footballdatabase Profile

1983 births
Living people
Guinean footballers
Guinean expatriate footballers
Expatriate footballers in Greece
Expatriate footballers in France
Super League Greece players
Super League Greece 2 players
Championnat National 2 players
Ergotelis F.C. players
Kallithea F.C. players
Apollon Pontou FC players
OFI Crete F.C. players
PAS Giannina F.C. players
Kalamata F.C. players
Villemomble Sports players
ES Viry-Châtillon players
Sportspeople from Conakry
Horoya AC players
Association football midfielders